The Board of Secondary Education, Karachi is a government board in Karachi for secondary education examination. It was established in 1950 by the promulgation of the Central Legislative Act No. XVI of 1950.  BSEK controls and organizes the secondary education examinations in Karachi.

See also 
 List of educational boards in Pakistan
 Board of Intermediate Education, Karachi

References

External links 
 BSEK official website

Education boards in Sindh